Queens Park, Australia may refer to:
Queens Park, the urban park
, the Sydney suburb located adjacent to the urban park
Queens Park, Victoria (disambiguation) 
Queens Park, 
Queens Park, Moonee Ponds
Queens Park, 
Queens Park, Western Australia